Wilma may refer to:


People
 Wilma (given name), a list of people and fictional characters with the given name or nickname
 Eva Wilma (1933–2021), Brazilian actress and dancer

Places
 Wilma Township, Pine County, Minnesota, United States
 Wilma Glacier, Antarctica

Other uses
 List of storms named Wilma
 Wilma (software), a combined service stub and transparent proxy tool
 Wilma Theatre (Missoula, Montana)
 Wilma Theater (Philadelphia), Pennsylvania
 Wilma, or The Story of Wilma Rudolph, a 1977 documentary about athlete Wilma Rudolph
 Wilma, a transportation boarding method
 Wilbur and Wilma, the official mascots at the University of Arizona in Tucson, Arizona

See also
 Vilma (disambiguation)